Baghat-e Qaraval (also Romanized as Bāghāt-e Qarāval) is a village in Darian Rural District, in the Central District of Shiraz County, Fars Province, Iran. At the 2006 census, its population was 30, in 12 families.

References 

Populated places in Shiraz County